George Findlay MacKay (July 11, 1900 – August 23, 1972) was a Canadian rower who competed in the 1924 Summer Olympics. He was born in Vancouver and died in Miami-Dade County, Florida, United States. In 1924 he won the silver medal as crew member of the Canadian boat in the coxless fours event.

References

External links
profile

1900 births
1972 deaths
Canadian male rowers
Olympic rowers of Canada
Rowers at the 1924 Summer Olympics
Olympic silver medalists for Canada
Rowers from Vancouver
Olympic medalists in rowing
Medalists at the 1924 Summer Olympics
Canadian expatriates in the United States